This is a complete filmography of Mexican actor Enrique Álvarez Félix. He appeared in many Mexican films and telenovelas.

His most famous film is La Casa del Pelícano, and his best known telenovela is Marisol; this was his last work. He played heroes on such telenovelas as Rina and Colorina.

References

Male actor filmographies
María Félix
Mexican filmographies